St Nicholas Church is a Church of England parish church in Kenilworth, Warwickshire, England.

The church is built of local red sandstones. The main phases of building are Decorated Gothic, Perpendicular Gothic and a Gothic Revival Victorian restoration of 1864. It is a Grade I listed building.

The church is a short distance south of the High Street, next to the Norman and Gothic ruins of St Mary's Abbey, over which much of the churchyard of St Nicholas now extends.

History
Until a chapel or church was built at Kenilworth, parishioners were required to walk to Stoneleigh every Sunday.

Foundation
No record of when the parish church was founded is known to survive. Geoffrey de Clinton, who was Chamberlain and Treasurer to King Henry I, founded  the Augustinian priory (later abbey) of St Mary the Virgin in 1119 and Kenilworth Castle in the early 1120s. About the same time Clinton founded a borough of Kenilworth and a deer park, but there is no record of a parish church for local laity being founded at the same time.

A tax record from AD 1210 notes a chapel in Kenilworth paying a tithe. But there is no record of where that chapel was or what congregation it served. A pair of sandstone cottages, 12 and 13 Castle Green, are the remains of a former more important building. Their orientation and thick walls are consistent with a Norman chapel, and there is even a Mass dial, but there is no proof that these cottages are the chapel recorded in 1210.

Building a parish church for laity next to an abbey church is a common arrangement. St Margaret's, Westminster next to Westminster Abbey is a well-known example. Just as Westminster Abbey held the advowson of St Margaret's, so Kenilworth Priory held that of the parish of St Nicholas.

One of the earliest pieces of masonry in the church of St Nicholas is the base of the font. This is Norman, and therefore predates the late 12th century. The square lower stages of the west tower have massive walls which could also be Norman. But that is conjecture.

The earliest known written evidence of a church for laity at Kenilworth is in the Registers of Godfrey Giffard, Bishop of Worcester, which record a "parson of the church at Kenilworth" in 1285. Pope Nicholas IV's taxation list of 1291 also records the church. It is therefore possible that the church of St Nicholas may have been founded in the 13th century, after 1210 and before 1285.

Expansion
The original church may have consisted of only a nave and chancel. In the chancel are Decorated Gothic sedilia, which may indicate a phase of building between about 1275 and 1380. In the 14th century the nave was widened by the addition of a south aisles with an arcade of five bays. The octagonal belfry and spire of the west tower are also 14th-century Decorated Gothic.

Later in the 14th century the nave was widened again with the addition of a north aisle with Perpendicular Gothic windows plus a northwest porch. The arcade of the north aisle is of only three bays, with the porch occupying the fourth bay. Also Perpendicular Gothic is the clerestory that was added to the nave.

There is a squint just south of the chancel arch, providing a line of sight from the south side of the nave to the chancel. Many squints in Mediæval churches were to allow a priest at a side altar to see the high altar in the chancel. However, position of the squint in this church suggests it may have been for a bellringer to see when to ring a Sanctus bell which would have been in a bell-gable outside above the chancel arch.

St Mary's priory was under royal patronage by early in the 13th century and was made an abbey in 1458. But in the Dissolution of the Monasteries it surrendered to The Crown in 1538. The Crown subsequently sold much of the abbey's estate, but it retained the advowson of the parish of St Nicholas.

Alterations after the Reformation
The abbey was largely demolished by 1547. In the demolition some architectural fragments were salvaged from the abbey and incorporated into the parish church. Most notable of these is the Norman west portal in the west tower, which Nikolaus Pevsner and Alexandra Wedgwood called "the most sumptuous Norman doorway in Warwickshire". This doorway may in fact be a composite, created in the 16th century from elements of more than one doorway of the demolished abbey.

Workmen demolishing the abbey melted down the lead from the roof to make "pigs" or "fothers" to be taken away. One such "pig" was lost until 1888, when it was found in the ruins. It bears the stamp of King Henry VIII's Commissioners. It is now displayed in the northeast corner of the chancel. In 1922 an archæological excavation of the abbey site found the sand-moulds for casting the pigs.

The nave had a steeply pitched roof until 1580, when Robert Dudley, 1st Earl of Leicester had it lowered to its present shallow pitch. The line of the earlier roof survives as a trace on the east side of the tower. The chancel] roof was taken down and relaid in 1692 under the auspices of the then Vicar, William Best, at a cost of £80.

Although the base of the font is Norman, the stem and bowl are later. They were made in 1664, to replace one that seems to have been broken in the English Civil War.

In the 18th century galleries were added to the nave and aisles to increase seating capacity. A gallery in the north aisle was added in 1751, followed by one in the south aisle in 1760. No record survives of when the west gallery for church musicians was added, but it is known to have existed by 1772. All three galleries were removed in 1850. Two years later a second Anglican church for Kenilworth, that of St John the Evangelist, was completed on the south side of the town, relieving the crowding of St Nicholas'.

Gothic Revival restorations
In 1858 lightning struck and damaged the spire, which thereafter was "entirely rebuilt".

In 1775 a three-decker pulpit had been installed in St Nicholas Church. It stood in the chancel arch, which impeded the congregation's view of the altar. Rev William Bickmore, who was Vicar 1855–75, had it removed in 1860. Also under Bickmore the church was "drastically" restored in 1864–65. A painting of the interior before the restoration shows the gallery in the south arcade and the old pulpit in the chancel arch. It shows also that the chancel arch was round-headed, and therefore Norman. Bickmore's restoration included removing this arch and replacing it with a Gothic Revival one to conform with the north and south arcades.

The pre-restoration painting shows also a flat ceiling in the nave. There was a similar ceiling in the chancel. Bickmore's restoration removed these ceilings.

The chancel was extended eastward and a two-bay aisle was added to its south side, originally to increase seating for the congregation in main services. The north aisle was extended eastward by one bay to create an organ loft, to which a vestry was attached. The south aisle was rebuilt, with new Gothic Revival windows matching the new aisle south of the chancel. The easternmost bay of the south aisle was extended southward to form a south transept. However, the south window of the south transept is older, with heraldic stained glass made in 1832. Sources disagree as to the date of the three-light east window in the chancel. It was inserted in either 1867 or 1876.

Until the 16th century a rood screen occupied the chancel arch. It had a gallery, which was reached via a flight of stairs at the northwest corner of the chancel. It was removed in the Reformation. In 1913 a Gothic Revival chancel screen was inserted, but without a rood. In 1918 the south aisle of the chancel was reordered to form a Lady chapel.

Features

Notable monuments

The most notable monuments in the church are wall-mounted Neoclassical marble reliefs. Joseph Nollekens (1737–1823) sculpted a putto leaning on a funerary urn to commemorate John Bird, who died in 1772. Richard Westmacott sculpted a relief of Caroline Gresley, who died in 1817. He shows her reclining on her deathbed, surrounded by her grieving family, as an angel hovers at the foot.

Bells and clock

The parish inventory of 1552 records four bells plus a Sanctus bell. They included the Great Bell which had been cast for St Mary's when Thomas Kidderminster was Prior (1403–39). In the Commonwealth era cracks were found in the bells, so in 1656 Bryan II Eldridge of Chertsey, Surrey melted them down and recast them as a ring of five and they were re-hung in a new frame. In 1734 Joseph Smith of Edgbaston recast the second bell and in 1793 John Briant of Hertford recast the treble bell.

In 1875 all but the tenor bell were removed. One was given to the newly built St Matthew's parish church in Surbiton, Surrey. John Taylor & Co of Loughborough melted down the other three and recast them as five, increasing the ring to the current six. Taylor's rehung the bells in an oak frame. In the 1950s this frame was found to have worked loose, so in 1957 Taylor's replaced it with a steel frame set in a concrete ring.

Simmons of Warwick made the present turret clock in the west tower in 1865. It is built to have three dials but only one, on the south side of the tower, was installed. However, in 1876 a dial was added on the ceiling of the ringing room. It has no hour hand, only a minute hand, and is for bell-ringers to time their ringing.

Organ
In 1806 a small organ was installed in the church at a cost of 70 Guineas. In 1903 it was replaced by the present instrument built by J Charles Lee of Coventry. It has three manuals and 1,500 pipes. By 1947 it was in poor order, but the parish felt unable to afford either to have it rebuilt or a new pipe organ built in its stead.

In 1949 Baron Kenilworth provided enough funds for the parish to buy a new two-manual electronic organ made by John Compton, whose usual customers were cinemas and public ballrooms. The pipe organ was left in situ. By the early 1960s the electronic organ was proving unsatisfactory, so in 1962–63 Compton's restored the pipe organ and took back the electronic organ in part exchange.

Churchyard

The churchyard includes numerous 18th- and 19th-century chest tombs and a few bale tombs. A granite column topped by a sculpture of a funerary urn marks the grave of Albert Morris, one of 34 people who were killed in the Shipton-on-Cherwell train crash on Christmas Eve 1874.

Imperial War Graves Commission headstones mark the graves of five servicemen from the First World War: four enlisted soldiers and a Royal Naval Air Service junior officer.

Royal visits
In the Middle Ages both Kenilworth Castle and St Mary's Abbey had royal connections and a succession of royal visitors. However, it is only after the Reformation that English monarchs are known to have visited the parish church.

Queen Elizabeth I visited Kenilworth in 1568 and 1575. The parish has a silver-gilt chalice and cover made in 1568, suggesting that she attended Holy Communion at St Nicholas that year. She is known to have done so during her later stay at the castle on two Sundays in July 1575.

King James I visited Kenilworth in 1616, when the church's great doorway was "unsealed" for his ceremonial entry.

List of incumbents
The names of incumbents from 1285 onward are recorded. There is a gap in the record from 1552 to 1611.

Stella Bailey (October 2016)
Richard Awre 1999
David John Rake 1986
Frank Spencer Bull 1966
John Alexander Thomson 1955
Owen Ambrose Griffiths 1945
Christopher Milner 1942, father of Major Christopher Milner, MC
Charles Henry Selfe Matthews 1938
Edward Stephen Gladstone Wickham 1931
Joseph William Dennis 1917
James Cairns 1911
Roland Forster Hanning 1897
William Bissett 1891
Alfred Jonathan Binnie 1884
Thomas Edmond Pennefather 1875
William Frederick Bickmore 1855
Edward Revell Eardley-Wilmot 1845
Thomas Parry 1841
Montague Villiers 1837
Samuel Butler 1802
Robert Sumner 1773
Thomas Lucas 1740
William Best 1690
James Dingley 1689
Robert Edmonds 1684
Eustace Craddock 1679
Henry Price 1678
James Chapman 1663
William Maddock 1661 (ejected 1662)
Anthony Woodhill 1648
William Morris 1646
Edward Barton 1643
John Bust 1611

Richard ap Damerllord 1552
Thomas Bird 1545
John Pultney 1524
Thomas Westbyr (alias Barbour) 1504
John Wright 1500
Thomas Rawlinson 1498
Hugh Chesnal 1481
John Arnold 1478
William Umfrey 1476
Richard Harris 1474
John Meverell 1471
John Baker 1467
John Brampton 1465
John Audley 1457
Richard Braunston 1454
William Chapman 1447
John Smith 1441
Richard Lyne 1437
Robert Loughborough 1436
William Porter 1411
Richard atte Birches 1373
William of Covele (Cowley) 1361
John King 1353
Roger de Birmingham 1351
Ralph Rokeby (Rugby) 1349
John de Calwich 1349
William de Preston 1349
Henry de Ansty 1346
Thomas de Wakefield 1341
John de Hanslope 1323
William de Stoneleigh 1316
Geoffrey Marmion 1312
Roger Boyvill 1312
Henry de Ladbroke 1300
Richard de Kenilworth 1285

References

Bibliography

External links

St Nicholas Kenilworth

Church of England church buildings in Warwickshire
Grade I listed churches in Warwickshire
History of Warwickshire
Kenilworth